College Days is a 2010 Indian Malayalam crime thriller film written and directed by G. N. Krishnakumar. The film stars Indrajith Sukumaran and Biju Menon with Rayan Raj, Sandhya, Dhanya Mary Varghese, Sajith Raj and Govind Padmasoorya in pivotal roles. The film was a box office failure.

Cast

Indrajith Sukumaran as Rohit Menon (fake)/ Anantha Krishnan 
Biju Menon as ACP Sudeep Hariharan IPS
 Rayan Raj as Satheesh Ramakrishnan 
Sandhya as Anu Ramachandran
Dhanya Mary Varghese as Rakhi
 Sajith Raj as Anand
Govind Padmasoorya as Joe Joseph
Jagathy Sreekumar as Philip Pothen, College Principal
Saikumar as Ramakrishnan, Satheesh's father 
Suraj Venjaramoodu as Shine Raj (Munthirippadam)
 Abu Salim as SI Habeeb
 Appa Haja as CI Vijayakumar
 Dinesh Panicker as Ramachandran, Anu's father
 Geetha Vijayan as Malathi, Satheesh's mother
 Lishoy as Joseph, Joe's father 
 Mohan Jose as Mathai
 Chembil Ashokan as MLA Keshavan Kutty 
 Venu Nagavally as real Rohit Menon's father
 Krishna as Rohit Menon (photo presence)
 Bhama as Athira (Cameo Appearance)

Production
The film was shot during June 2010.

Soundtrack 
Music by Ronnie Raphael.

Reception
A critic from Sify wrote that "College Days could be a classic case of not using the resources well. One gets the feeling that if it was approached with more passion and discipline, it could have been a nicer movie". Veeyen of Nowrunning stated that "College Days looks like an earnest endeavor, but one that is entirely unaware of its predecessors. With a bit more careful plotting, the film could have emerged much better than it has". A critic from Indiaglitz opined that "Final word? `College Days' is a well executed film, from a more than average scripts, with the ensemble cast pitching in competent performances".

References